= Gwintinli =

Coordinates: 09°30′00″N 000°41′00″W

Gwintinli (also known as Guntingli) is a populated place in Ghana. It is about 151 m above sea level.
